Rubus odoratus, the purple-flowered raspberry, flowering raspberry, or Virginia raspberry, is a species of Rubus, native to eastern North America, from Nova Scotia west to Ontario and Wisconsin, and south along the Appalachian Mountains as far as Georgia and Alabama.

Rubus odoratus is a shrub growing to 3 meters (10 feet) tall, with perennial, not biennial, stems (unlike many other species in the genus). Also, unlike most other related species this plant does not have thorns.  The leaves are palmately lobed with five (rarely three or seven) lobes, up to 25 cm (10 inches) long and broad, superficially resembling maple leaves. The flowers are 3–5 cm (1.2–2 inches) in diameter, with five magenta or occasionally white petals; they are produced from early spring to early fall. The red edible fruit matures in late summer to early autumn, and resembles a large, flat raspberry with many drupelets, and is rather fuzzy to the touch and tongue.

Gallery

Cultivation and uses 
Rubus odoratus is widely grown as an ornamental plant for its conspicuous flowers with a long flowering period. This plant likes partial shade, rich, slightly acid soil and moderate water.  It is locally naturalized in parts of Washington state and also in Europe, notably south eastern England.

References

External links
 

odoratus
Berries
Flora of Canada
Flora of the Eastern United States
Plants described in 1753
Taxa named by Carl Linnaeus